Subjected to legal regulations, the Hong Kong Disciplined Services are made up of the following:-

The Independent Commission Against Corruption (ICAC) reports directly to the Chief Executive. Although they are not typically uniformed, they are considered as a regular force. Much of their work is classified. They treat the identity of the complainant in strict confidence (try to keep it confidential). After lodging a complaint to the ICAC, the complainant cannot disclose the identity of the subject person.

Six regular forces report to the Security Bureau:
 Hong Kong Police Force
 Hong Kong Auxiliary Police Force
 Hong Kong Fire Services Department
 Emergency Ambulance Service 
 Correctional Services Department
 Customs and Excise Department
 Immigration Department
 Government Flying Service

Two auxiliary forces also report to the Security Bureau. They are mainly staffed by volunteers trained in responding to emergency and operations.
 Civil Aid Service
 Auxiliary Medical Services

References

Disciplined Services